On the Road is a 1957 novel by Jack Kerouac. 

On the Road may also refer to:

Film 
 On the Road (1936 film), a French comedy film directed by Jean Boyer
 On the Road (2012 film), a film adaptation of Kerouac's novel
 On the Road (The String Cheese Incident) (2003), a documentary taping project by the band The String Cheese Incident
 On the Road: A Document (1964), a documentary by Noriaki Tsuchimoto

Literature 
 "On the Road" (1886), a short story by Anton Chekhov
 On the Road (Johnson book), a book by the NASCAR driver Jimmie Johnson and his wife Chandra

Music

Albums 
 On the Road (Art Farmer album), 1976
 On the Road (Count Basie album), 1980
 On the Road (The Country Gentlemen album), 1963
 On the Road (George Carlin album) or the title track, 1977
 On the Road (Lee Roy Parnell album), or the title song (see below), 1993
 On the Road (Miss Kittin album), 2002
 On the Road (The String Cheese Incident), a series of live recordings
 On the Road (Traffic album), 1973
 On the Road, a series of live albums by Camel, 1992–1997
 On the Road, by Christy Moore, 2017

Songs 
 "On the Road" (Baekhyun song), 2020
 "On the Road" (Bryan Adams song), 2021
 "On the Road" (Dick Damron song), 1976
 "On the Road" (Lee Roy Parnell song), 1993
 "On the Road", by Larry Conklin
 "On the Road", by Laylizzy, 2016
 "On the Road", by Post Malone from Hollywood's Bleeding, 2019
 "On the Road", by Shinhwa from The Return, 2012
 "On the Road", by Syd from Always Never Home, 2017
 "On the Road", from the Thumbelina film soundtrack, 1994

Television

Series
 On the Road (Czech TV series), a documentary travelogue series since 2006
 On the Road (Hong Kong TV series), a 2006–2008 Cantonese-language travel series
 On the Road (Italian TV series), a 2006 series featuring Ludmilla Radchenko
 On the Road (web series), a 2013 Chinese web series released by Youku
 On the Road with Austin & Santino, a 2010 American reality-documentary television series

Episodes and news features
 "On the Road" (news feature), an American travelogue feature on CBS News telecasts from 1967 to 1994, reported by Charles Kuralt
 "On the Road" (news feature), a renewed version of the original segment, reported by Steve Hartman since 2011
 "On the Road" (Wheeler Dealers), the fifth series (2008) of the British car show Wheeler Dealers

See also
 Off the Road, a 1990 autobiography by Carolyn Cassady
 On the Road Again (disambiguation)